The 30th Guldbagge Awards ceremony, presented by the Swedish Film Institute, honored the best Swedish films of 1994, and took place on 30 January 1995. A Pizza in Jordbro directed by Rainer Hartleb was presented with the award for Best Film.

Winner and nominees

Awards
Winners are listed first and highlighted in boldface.

References

External links
Official website
Guldbaggen on Facebook
Guldbaggen on Twitter
30th Guldbagge Awards at Internet Movie Database

1995 in Swedish cinema
1994 film awards
Guldbagge Awards ceremonies
1990s in Stockholm
January 1995 events in Europe